Obsessed may refer to

Film and television
 The Late Edwina Black (US title: Obsessed) a British murder/mystery film
 Obsessed (1977 film), an American pornographic film
 Obsessed (1987 film), a Canadian drama
 Obsessed (1992 film), an American made-for-TV drama
 Obsessed, a 2002 American TV film starring Jenna Elfman
 Obsessed (2009 film), an American thriller starring Beyoncé
 Obsessed (2014 film), a South Korean erotic period thriller
 Obsessed (TV series), a documentary series

Music
 The Obsessed, an American heavy metal band
 The Obsessed (album), by the band of the same name
 Obsessed (album), an album by Dan + Shay
 "Obsessed" (Mariah Carey song), 2009
"Obsessed", a song from the 2009 EP The Time of Our Lives by Miley Cyrus 
 "Obsessed", a song from the 2016 album This Is What the Truth Feels Like by Gwen Stefani
 "Obsessed", a 2007 song by Maggie Lindemann
 "Obsessed" (Addison Rae song), 2021

Other

 Obsessed (novel), a 2005 novel by Ted Dekker

See also

Obsession (disambiguation)